Brahim Moumou (born 30 August 2001) is a German professional footballer who plays as a forward for DAC Dunajská Streda.

Career
Moumou made his professional Fortuna Liga debut for DAC Dunajská Streda in match against Žilina on 4 April 2021.

References

External links
 FC DAC 1904 Dunajská Streda official club profile 
 Futbalnet profile 
 
 

2001 births
Living people
German footballers
German expatriate footballers
Association football forwards
FC ŠTK 1914 Šamorín players
FC DAC 1904 Dunajská Streda players
2. Liga (Slovakia) players
Slovak Super Liga players
German expatriate sportspeople in Slovakia
Expatriate footballers in Slovakia